Van Zant II is an album released by American musical duo Van Zant. It was released in 2001 by Sanctuary Records. The single "Get What You Got Comin'" achieved chart success.

This album has been released with the Copy Control protection system in some regions.

Track listing
"Oklahoma"  - 5:27
"Get What You Got Comin'"  - 4:15
"Heart Of An Angel"  - 4:03
"Is It For Real"  - 3:54
"Imagination"  - 4:43
"At Least I'm Free"  - 4:55
"Baby Get Blue"  - 4:24
"What's The World Coming To"  - 3:57
"Wildside"  - 4:06
"Alive"  - 5:09

Personnel

Van Zant
 Donnie Van Zant - lead vocals, background vocals
 Johnny Van Zant - lead vocals, background vocals

Additional Musicians
 Mike Brignardello - bass guitar
 Pat Buchanan - guitar
 Chris Carmichael - strings
 Carol Chase - background vocals
 Bill Cuomo - Hammond organ, piano
 Gary Dales - background vocals
 Shane Fontayne - electric guitar
 Janelle Guillot - voice over
 Vicki Hampton - background vocals
 Ioannis - background vocals
 Robert White Johnson - percussion, background vocals
 Jerry McPherson - acoustic guitar, electric guitar
 Tony Morra - drums
 Jimmy Nichols - strings
 Michael O'Hara - background vocals
 Dale Rossington - background vocals
 Kenny Wayne Shepherd - electric guitar on "Get What You Got Comin'" and "At Least I'm Free"

References

[ Van Zant II] at Allmusic

2001 albums
Van Zant (band) albums
Sanctuary Records albums